Merwyn Edwin Castle (2 November 1942 - 2 August 2021) was an Anglican Bishop of the Diocese of False Bay.

References

20th-century English Anglican priests
21st-century Anglican Church of Southern Africa bishops
1942 births
2021 deaths